Bhaskaracharya Pratishthana is a research and education institute for mathematics in Pune, India, founded by noted Indian-American mathematician professor Shreeram Abhyankar.
The institute is named after the great ancient Indian Mathematician Bhaskaracharya (Born in 1114 A.D.). Bhaskaracharya Pratishthana is a Pune, India, based institute founded in 1976. It has researchers working in many areas of mathematics, particularly in algebra and number theory.

Since 1992, the Pratishthan has also been a recognized center for conducting Regional Mathematics Olympiad (RMO) under the National Board for Higher Mathematics (NBHM) for Maharashtra and Goa Region. This has enabled the Pratishthan to train lots of students from std. V to XII for this examination. Many students who received training at BP have won medals in the International Mathematical Olympiad.

Pratishthana publishes the mathematics periodical Bona Mathematica and has published texts in higher and olympiad mathematics. Besides this the Pratishthan holds annual / biennial conferences/Workshops in some research areas in higher mathematics attended by Indian/Foreign scholars and Professors. The Pratishthan has organized a number of workshops for research students and college teachers under the aegis of NBHM/NCM. The National Board for Higher Mathematics has greatly helped Pratishthan to enrich its library and the Department of Atomic Energy and the Mathematics Department of S. P. Pune University have rendered active co-operation in holding conferences/workshops.

It also conducts the BMTSC exam which is a school-level mathematics competition for students studying in the 5th and the 6th grade. The objectives of the competition are listed below:
1. Identify good students of mathematics at an early age.
2. A pre Olympiad type competition.
3. To enhance Mathematical ability and logical thinking.
4. Nurture programs for successful students to improve their ability.

Projects
Recently, in Pratishthana, two projects supported by MHRD have been started. One is on e-learning and other on the use of free open source software in Mathematics education (FOOSME). In the e-learning project video broadcasting of online Maths lectures is being done. The topics are Ring Theory and Complex Analysis. These lectures are at Undergraduate levels. The FOSSME project is all about exploring FOSS for Maths Education. There were 3 national level workshops held on FOSS for Maths education, Scilab, Advanced and LaTeX Advanced.

References

External links 
 Home Page of Bhaskaracharya Pratishthana
 Home Page of FOSSME project

Research institutes in Pune
Schools of mathematics
Indian mathematics
1976 establishments in Maharashtra